Carenum brevicolle is a species of ground beetle in the subfamily Scaritinae. It was described by Sloane in 1894.

References

brevicolle
Beetles described in 1894